{{Infobox album
| name       = Dark Island
| type       = Album
| artist     = Pram
| cover      = PramDarkIsland.jpg
| alt        =
| released   = 2003
| recorded   =
| venue      =
| studio     =
| genre      = Avant-garde
| length     = 44:43
| label      = Domino Records
| producer   =
| prev_title = The Museum of Imaginary Animals| prev_year  = 2000
| next_title = The Moving Frontier
| next_year  = 2007
}}Dark Island''' is an album by English band Pram, released in 2003. The album contains the song "Track of the Cat", which was used on a BT advert in 2003.

Track listing
All tracks by Pram

 "Track of the Cat" –	4:13
 "Penny Arcade" – 4:27
 "The Pawnbroker" – 3:19
 "Paper Hats" – 4:05 
 "Peepshow" – 3:28
 "Sirocco" – 4:25 
 "The Archivist" – 6:01
 "Goodbye" – 5:06
 "Leeward" – 3:36
 "Distant Islands" – 6:03

Personnel 
Rosie Cuckston – vocals, keyboards, omnichord
Matt Eaton - guitar, bass guitar, sampler, keyboards
Sam Owen –  bass guitar, guitar, keyboards, accordion, woodwind
Max Simpson – keyboards, sampler
Stephen Perkins – drums, percussion
Laurence Hunt – drums, percussion
Alex Clare – trumpet, trombone
Nick Sales – keyboards, theremin, sampler
Holly Simpson – violin
Megan Bassett – violin
Grandmaster Gareth – string arrangements

References

Pram (band) albums
2003 albums